Piniella is a surname. Notable people with the surname include:

Joaquim Amat-Piniella (1913–1974), Catalan writer and politician
Lou Piniella (born 1943), American baseball player and manager

Surnames of Spanish origin
Surnames of Catalan origin